Torgay Region (also Turgay Region, Turgay Oblast, Turgayskaya Oblast) was an oblast (a first-level administrative and municipal unit) of the Kazakh Soviet Socialist Republic and of independent Kazakhstan from 1970 to 1988 and from 1990 to 1997. Its seat was in the city of Arkalyk. The region was located in the center of Kazakhstan, and its territory is currently divided between Kostanay and Akmola Regions.

History
Turgay Region was established on 23 November 1970 on the lands that previously belonged to Kostanay and Tselinograd Regions.

References

Kazakh Soviet Socialist Republic
Kostanay Region
Akmola Region
Former oblasts of Kazakhstan